James Broun may refer to:

Sir James Broun, 7th Baronet (1768–1844), of the Broun baronets
Sir James Lionel Broun, 11th Baronet (1875–1962), of the Broun baronets
James Broun-Ramsay, 1st Marquess of Dalhousie (1812–1860), Scottish statesman

See also
James Brown (disambiguation)
Broun (surname)